At the 1993 Mediterranean Games, the athletics events were held in Narbonne, Languedoc-Roussillon, France from 17–24 June 1993. A total of 36 events were contested, of which 20 by male and 16 by female athletes.

The host nation France easily topped the medal table, taking 15 gold medals and 38 medals overall (over a third of the total). Italy was the next most successful nation, with six golds among its 16 medals. Greece and Morocco was third and fourth, respectively, each having won four gold medals. Of the thirteen nations who entered athletes into the tournament, only Albania and Cyprus did not reach the medal table.

The event programme was reduced for the 1993 games: the women's 4×400 metres relay and the men's hammer throw, decathlon and 20 kilometres walk competitions were not held that year. The women's marathon was contested for the first time, while the women's 3000 metres was held for the last time (later being replaced by the 5000 metres event).

Noureddine Morceli won the men's 1500 metres in a time of 3:29.20 minutes – the second fastest time at that point, after his own world record. He was one of eight athletes to break a Mediterranean Games record at the 1993 edition. Zid Abou Hamed set both a games and Syrian national record in the men's 400 metres hurdles. The marathon races saw Davide Milesi and Helena Javornik establish new bests. Greek runner Alexandros Terzian broke the men's 100 metres record, while a new best of 6256 points for the heptathlon was set by Nathalie Teppe (also the javelin throw gold medallist).

The competition was part of the buildup to the 1993 World Championships in Athletics. Morceli and Fermín Cacho repeated their Mediterranean 1–2 in the men's 1500 m, but reigning women's Olympic champion Hassiba Boulmerka (800 m winner and 1500 m runner-up in Narbonne) was relegated to the bronze medal in her final. The Mediterranean and Olympic champion in the 10,000 metres, Khalid Skah, was out of the medal in the world 5000 m final.

The event saw future Olympic champions Konstantinos Kenteris, Jean Galfione and Ghada Shouaa get their first senior outdoor medals. Brigita Bukovec went on to an Olympic silver in 1996 after her 100 metres hurdles win in Narbonne, while Nezha Bidouane defended her Mediterranean 400 m hurdles title and would later become a double world champion in the event.

Medal summary

Men

Women

Medal table

Participation
Thirteen of the nineteen nations participating at the games entered athletes into the athletics competition.

References

Results
Affiche officielle des JM d’Athènes 1993. CIJM (1993). Retrieved on 2013-10-06.
Mediterranean Games. GBRAthletics. Retrieved on 2013-10-06.

External links
Official website

1993
Sports at the 1993 Mediterranean Games
Mediterranean Games
1993 Mediterranean Games